Celsiella revocata is a species of frog in the family Centrolenidae. It is endemic to the Venezuelan Coastal Range. Its common name, El Tovar glass frog, refers to its type locality, Colonia Tovar.
Its natural habitats are montane forests along streams; it is usually found on vegetation above the streams.

Celsiella revocata is a common frog in undisturbed habitats but threatened by habitat loss. Its total population is decreasing.

References

Celsiella
Amphibians of Venezuela
Endemic fauna of Venezuela
Taxa named by Juan A. Rivero
Taxonomy articles created by Polbot
Amphibians described in 1985